The men's 63 kg (138.6 lbs) Semi-Contact category at the W.A.K.O. World Championships 2007 in Coimbra was the second lightest of the male Semi-Contact tournaments being the equivalent of the light welterweight division when compared to Full-Contact's weight classes.  There were 20 men from three continents (Europe, Asia, and North America) taking part in the competition.  Each of the matches was three rounds of two minutes each and were fought under Semi-Contact rules.   

As there were not enough men for a tournament designed for 32, 12 of the fighters received byes through to the second round.  The tournament gold medal was won by Italy's Andrea Lucchese who defeated Hungary's Viktor Hirsch in the final by points decision.  Defeated semi-finalists Turkey's Taskin Kahveci and Slovenia's Juvan Klemen won bronze medals.

Results

Key

See also 
 List of WAKO Amateur World Championships
 List of WAKO Amateur European Championships
 List of male kickboxers

References

External links 
 WAKO World Association of Kickboxing Organizations Official Site

Kickboxing events at the WAKO World Championships 2007 Coimbra
2007 in kickboxing
Kickboxing in Portugal